Ytrebygda Church ( or ) is a parish church of the Church of Norway in Bergen Municipality in Vestland county, Norway. It is located in the village of Blomsterdalen in the borough of Ytrebygda in the city of Bergen (just a little east of Bergen Flesland Airport). It is one of two churches for the Fana parish which is part of the Fana prosti (deanery) in the Diocese of Bjørgvin. The concrete and wood church was built in a rectangular style in 2011 using designs by the architectural firm . The church seats about 210 people.

History
The church in Ytrebygda was built in 2010-2011 using plans by the architectural firm . The new building was consecrated on 18 December 2011 by the Bishop Halvor Nordhaug.

Media gallery

See also
List of churches in Bjørgvin

References

Churches in Bergen
Rectangular churches in Norway
Concrete churches in Norway
21st-century Church of Norway church buildings
Churches completed in 2011
2011 establishments in Norway